George T. Warren (born c. 1842, date of death unknown) was a Michigan politician.

Political life
He was elected as the Mayor of the City of Flint in 1886 for a single 1-year term.

Post-political life
Warren moved out the city by 1916.

References

Mayors of Flint, Michigan
1840s births
20th-century deaths